Anthony Roane (died 1583), of Hounslow, Middlesex, was an English politician.

He was a Member (MP) of the Parliament of England for Ripon in 1571.

References

Year of birth missing
1583 deaths
English MPs 1571
People from Hounslow